Modesto Gavazzi may refer to:

 Modesto Gavazzi (archbishop) (died 1657), Italian Roman Catholic archbishop
 Modesto Gavazzi (bishop) (died 1608), Italian Roman Catholic bishop